Orlendis Carlos Benítez Hernández (born 26 November 1996) is a Cuban footballer who plays for the Simcoe County Rovers in League1 Ontario.

Playing career
He began his career in his native Cuba with FC La Habana. During the 2018–19 season, he was named the Best Player of the Campeonato Nacional de Fútbol de Cuba.

In 2021 and 2022, he played for Vaughan Azzurri in League1 Ontario. In June 2022, he joined Canadian Premier League club Forge FC on a short-term loan. He made his debut for Forge on 12 June against Pacific FC.

In February 2023, he signed with the Simcoe County Rovers in League1 Ontario.

International career
In late August 2019, he received his first call-up to the Cuba national football team for their 2019–20 CONCACAF Nations League matches against Canada in September. However, ahead of the match, he defected from the squad to settle in Canada and not return to Cuba.

References

External links

1996 births
Living people
Association football midfielders
Cuban footballers
Sportspeople from Havana
Cuban expatriate footballers
Expatriate soccer players in Canada
Cuban expatriate sportspeople in Canada
League1 Ontario players
Canadian Premier League players
Vaughan Azzurri players
Forge FC players
Simcoe County Rovers FC players